(Roman Catholic) Diocese of Linares may refer to the following Latin Catholic jurisdictions:

 Diocese of Linares, Chile
 Diocese of Linares, Mexico
 the former Roman Catholic Diocese of Linares or Nueva León (promoted to archbishopric; now Monterrey)